Senator Hancock may refer to:

John E. Hancock (1903–1982), Vermont State Senate
Kelly Hancock (born 1963), Texas State Senate
Loni Hancock (born 1940), California State Senate
Mary Louise Hancock (1920–2017), New Hampshire State Senate
Tom Hancock (1948–2016), Iowa State Senate